Priessnitz or Prießnitz may refer to:

Prießnitz, a village in Saxony-Anhalt, Germany
Prießnitz (Elbe), a river of Saxony, Germany
Priessnitz (band), a rock band from the Czech Republic

People with that surname
Vincenz Priessnitz (1799–1851), pioneer of hydrotherapy